Tredegar Town Band are a brass band from the town of Tredegar, located in South Wales, founded in 1849.
They are managed by Ian Porthouse.

History
The origins of the band date back to 1849, when they participated in a procession to celebrate the opening of a new mill. The band was formally constituted in 1876, following donations from the public.

After the Second World War, they enjoyed increasing success, winning the Second Section Champion Band of Great Britain in 1973, the Champion Band of Wales in 1974, and the Grand Shield in 1976.

They placed on the podium in the European Brass Band Championship in 1991 and 2011, runners-up at the National Championship of Great Britain in 1993 and 2003, and runners-up at the British Open in 1996, before winning the British Open for the first time in 2010.

In 2013, they won the British Open for the second time, beating the second-place band, Cory.

Contemporary activities
As of 2019, Tredegar Town Band are currently ranked #4 out of all brass bands in the world, according to 4barsrest's 2022 list. This is down significantly from their 2013 ranking, where they were rated #2.

References

British brass bands
1849 establishments in Wales
Tredegar
Welsh musical groups